Epsilon Scuti, Latinized from ε Scuti, is a probable astrometric binary
 star system in the constellation Scutum. It is faintly visible to the naked eye with an apparent visual magnitude of +4.88. Based upon an annual parallax shift of 5.71 mas as seen from Earth,> it is located approximately 570 light years from the Sun. It is moving closer to the Sun with a radial velocity of −9.8 km/s. 
Epsilon Scuti was a latter designation of 3 Aquilae.

The visible component is a yellow-hued bright giant with a G-type bright giant It is radiating 403 times the Sun's luminosity from its photosphere at an effective temperature of 4,500 K. Epsilon Scuti has at least three faint visual companions, two 14th magnitude stars, B and D, separated from the primary by 13.6 and 15.4 arcseconds respectively, and the 13th magnitude C, which is 38 arcseconds away.

References

G-type bright giants
Astrometric binaries
Scuti, Epsilon
Scutum (constellation)
BD-08 4686
173009
091845
7032
TIC objects